The 1983 West Virginia Mountaineers football team represented West Virginia University in the 1983 NCAA Division I-A football season. It was the Mountaineers' 91st overall season and they competed as a Division I-A Independent. The team was led by head coach Don Nehlen, in his fourth year, and played their home games at Mountaineer Field in Morgantown, West Virginia. They finished the season with a record of nine wins and three losses (9–3 overall) and with a victory over Kentucky in the Hall of Fame Classic.

Schedule

Roster

Season summary
Jeff Hostetler was the starting quarterback for the Mountaineers. He led the team with 2345 passing yards and 16 touchdowns. Leading the team in rushing was Tom Gray with 498 net yards. Rich Hollins led the team in receiving with 50 receptions for 781 yards. Paul Woodside was also a reliable commodity for the Mountaineers. The Mountaineer offense was rolling after its first two games. They had beaten their first two opponents by a combined 103–10 score, with a 55–3 win over Ohio, and a 48–7 win over Pacific. Their first test of the season came on the road against #17 Maryland, where the Mountaineers emerged victorious 31–21. The next week, the Mountaineers played on the road, against a second straight ranked opponent in #19 Boston College. Again, the Mountaineers emerged victorious 27–17. They then avenged a 13–16 loss at Pittsburgh the year before, by beating the Panthers 24–21 at home. The next week, they posted a second consecutive win over a major rival by shutting out Virginia Tech 13–0 at home. The win moved WVU's ranking up to 3rd in the major polls. The Mountaineers were beaten at Penn State, the next week, ruining their national title hopes. It is very possible, that had the Mountaineers won that, they would be playing for the national championship. They were still hung over the week after, losing to Miami 20–3, giving them 2 straight losses. WVU came back with a 27–9 win over Temple, and a 35–7 win over Rutgers. They lost at Syracuse the next week 27–16, and closed out the season with a 20–16 win over Kentucky in the Hall of Fame Bowl.

Game summaries

Pittsburgh

Source:

References

West Virginia
All-American Bowl champion seasons
West Virginia Mountaineers football seasons
West Virginia Mountaineers football